Vidra is a commune located in Vrancea County, Romania. It is composed of nine villages: Burca, Irești, Ruget, Scafari, Șerbești, Tichiriș, Vidra, Viișoara and Voloșcani.

Natives
 Ionel Badiu
 Valeriu Cotea

References

Communes in Vrancea County
Localities in Western Moldavia